Phaulacridium otagoense is an endemic New Zealand grasshopper found at low elevation throughout the central South Island (Mackenzie Basin and Central Otago).

Distribution and habitat
 
The most southern known location is found at Lake Roxburgh and the most northern known location is found on the Richmond Range. The distribution of P. otagoense is being reduced by expansion and hybridization with P. marginale. Where these two grasshopper species meet populations consist of individuals with mixed phenotype, intermediate between the two parental taxa.

Species description
The wings on P. otagoense are micropterous (small wings) between  making this species flightless like most of New Zealand grasshoppers. However, unlike Phaulacridium marginale no fully winged adults have ever been found.

Male body length ; Female body length .

Type information
Ritchie & Westerman, 1984: The taxonomy, distribution and origins of two species of Phaulacridium (Orthoptera: Acrididae) in the South Island of New Zealand. Biological Journal of the Linnean Society (1984) 21: 283-298. With 4 figures
Type locality: Omarama. .
Type specimen: Male; 9 Jan 1974; M. Westerman; Holotype is deposited in the Canterbury Museum, Christchurch.
Paratypes. Are deposited in the Canterbury Museum, Christchurch, Natural History Museum, London, and Australian National Insect Collection, Canberra.

References

Acrididae
Acrididae of New Zealand
Insects described in 1984
Endemic fauna of New Zealand
Endemic insects of New Zealand